Zhivopisny Bridge (lit. Picturesque  bridge) is a cable-stayed bridge  that spans Moskva River in north-western Moscow, Russia. It is the first cable-stayed bridge in Moscow. It opened on 27 December 2007 as a part of Krasnopresnensky avenue. It is also the highest cable-stayed bridge in Europe.

 The author of the project is the architect Nikolay Shumakov.

Design and specifications

The bridge is unique in that most of its length runs along the river, not across it (see the site plan). Thus the bridge and highway it carries will bypass the protected territory of Serebryany Bor island. 

The total length of an S-shaped deck exceeds 1.5 kilometers, including a 409.5-meter long, 47-meter wide main section running 30 meters above and along the centerline of river Moskva. The main pylon is a 105-meter high arch across the river, carrying the weight of deck through 78 cables 

Under the top of the arch, there is a disk-like structure that was intended to house a restaurant. The restaurant project is now abandoned due to fire safety concerns and a lack of investment.

See also
 List of bridges in Moscow
 Gateway Arch
 Most SNP, a cable-stayed bridge in Bratislava with a restaurant on the tower

References

External links
Metal Spider Panorama
Contractor's site
 Photos
Photos of bridge under construction
Photos of bridge under construction
August 2006 photographs
Panorama: Summer 2006
 , CR May 9 - Construction Review Magazine, p. 12

Bridges in Moscow
Cable-stayed bridges in Russia
Bridges completed in 2007
Road bridges in Russia